Owraki may refer to:

 ستار اورکی